Urtaca is a commune in the Haute-Corse department of France on the island of Corsica.

Geography
Urtaca is located in the north of Corsica at the confluence of the Ostricone and the Fiume di Gargalagne at the foot of -high Mont Vicinasco.

Population

See also
Communes of the Haute-Corse department

References

Communes of Haute-Corse